A number of ships were named Krusaa, including:

, a Danish cargo ship in service 1934–37
, a Danish cargo ship in service 1949–60

Ship names